Telémachos Alexiou (born 3 January 1992 in Evvoia, Greece) is a Greek-German film maker and visual artist.

Early life
Telémachos Alexiou was born in Chalkida, Evvoia, Greece. He is the son of Pavlina Alexiou, a local real estate agent, and Konstantinos Alexiou, a math professor. As a child he trained as a ballroom dancer. By the age of sixteen he had won all ballroom dance national titles.

At the age of seventeen Alexiou moved to London, UK, to study Communications & Visual Culture and later to Berlin, Germany, where he studied film theory and started working as a filmmaker and artist.

Career
In 2009, Alexiou directed his first medium-length experimental  film, The Logic Of The Cat, which had a cinema release only two years later.

In 2010, he attracted international attention with his experimental video The Dream Of Norma, starring Vaginal Davis, which premiered at the Berlin International Film Festival.

After The Dream Of Norma, Alexiou directed multiple short and medium-length films and video works, including the film Venus In The Garden, which have been presented in various film festivals and art spaces around the world such as Temporäre Kunsthalle Berlin and LA Outfest.

In 2014, Telémachos Alexiou finished his first feature film, Queen Antigone (Vasilissa Antigoni), a reconfiguration of the ancient tragedy Antigone by Sophocles. The film was produced by the legendary Berlin film producer Jürgen Brüning. It premiered at the Mumbai Film Festival in October of the same year and had its European premiere at the Thessaloniki International Film Festival a month later.

Personal life
Alexiou identifies as gay and describes his films as partly autobiographical.

Languages
Telémachos Alexiou is also a polyglot. He currently speaks nine languages fluently and understands a dozen more.

Filmography

References

Greek artists
1992 births
Living people
Greek emigrants to Germany
People from Chalcis